Kõo is a village in Viljandi County, Estonia. It was the administrative centre of Kõo Parish. Kõo has a population of 326 (as of 2000).

References

External links
Põhja-Sakala Parish 

Villages in Viljandi County
Kreis Fellin